Forrest Edward Mars Sr. (March 21, 1904 – July 1, 1999) was an American billionaire businessman and the driving force of the Mars candy empire. He is best known for introducing Milky Way (1924) and Mars (1932) chocolate bars, and M&M's (1941) chocolate, as well as orchestrating the launch of Uncle Ben's Rice. He was the son of candy company Mars, Inc. founder Frank C. Mars and his first wife Ethel G. Mars (née Kissack).

Early life and career
Mars was born in Wadena, Minnesota, and raised by his maternal grandparents in Saskatchewan, Canada, after his parents' divorce when he was just a child. He rarely saw his father. After high school, he entered the University of California, Berkeley, and later transferred to Yale University, where he completed a degree in industrial engineering in 1928.

As an adult, Forrest Mars reunited with his father at Mars, Inc. However, the pair ran into a disagreement when Forrest wanted to expand abroad while his father did not. For a few years he worked at the new plant in Chicago and supervised the development of the Snickers and 3 Musketeers bars. Frances Herdlinger, a newly hired chemist at the Chicago lab of Mars Inc, remembered "Forrest Mars would turn up often with something new for us to try."  Mars then took a buyout from his father and moved to England where he created the Mars bar and Maltesers while estranged from his father in 1933. In Europe, Mars briefly worked for Nestlé and the Tobler company.

In 1934, he bought a British company, Chappel Bros, specialized in canned meat for dogs. Due to the lack of competition, Forrest took control of this market as he launched and marketed Chappie's canned food.

After he returned to the United States, Mars started his own food business, Food Products Manufacturing, where he established the Uncle Ben's Rice line and a pet food business, Pedigree. In partnership later with Bruce Murrie, Mars developed M&M's, the chocolate candy covered in a crunchy shell which "melts in your mouth, not in your hands," in 1940. They were possibly modeled after Smarties. Peanut M&M's were introduced in 1954 although Forrest had been allergic to peanuts his entire life. Murrie later left the business.

Following the death of his father, Forrest Mars took over the family business, Mars, Inc, merging it with his own company in 1964.  
He was married to Audrey Ruth Meyer (b. May 25, 1910, in Chicago, d. June 15, 1989, in Washington, D.C.), and they had three children – Forrest Jr., John, and Jacqueline.

Mars retired from Mars, Inc., in 1973, turning the company over to his children.

In 1980, retired and living in Henderson, Nevada, he founded Ethel M Chocolates, named after his mother. Ethel M was purchased by Mars, Inc. in 1988.

Mars died at age 95 on July 1, 1999, in Miami, Florida, having amassed a fortune of $4 billion. Forbes magazine ranked him as the 30th richest American (Forrest Jr. and John were 29th and 31st, respectively) and as the 103rd wealthiest person in the world. He left the business jointly to his three children.

Mars was inducted into the Junior Achievement U.S. Business Hall of Fame in 1984.

See also
List of billionaires

References

Further reading 
Brenner, Joel Glenn (1999). The Emperors of Chocolate. Random House. .
Cadbury, Deborah (2010). Chocolate Wars. Harper Collins. .

External links
Profile in Fortune Magazine, published in 1967, republished March 31, 2013. 

1904 births
1999 deaths
American billionaires
American food company founders
Businesspeople from Minnesota
20th-century American businesspeople
20th-century American Episcopalians
Burials at Lakewood Cemetery
Businesspeople from Saskatchewan
Businesspeople in confectionery
Mars family
People from Wadena, Minnesota
University of California, Berkeley alumni
Yale University alumni